The Department of Defence was an Australian government department that was established at Federation and existed until 1921 when it was replaced with the subsequent Department of Defence.

Scope
Information about the department's functions and/or government funding allocation could be found in the Administrative Arrangements Orders (AAOs).

In early AAOs, the department was responsible for Naval and Military defence and control of railway transport for defence.

Structure
The Department was a Commonwealth Public Service department, staffed by officials who were responsible to the Minister for Defence.

The Secretaries of the Department were Muirhead Collins (1901–1910), Samuel Pethebridge (1910–1918) and Thomas Trumble (1918‑1921). Pethebridge was actually Acting in the Secretary role since 1906, he died in 1918 while in office as permanent departmental Secretary.

References

Ministries established in 1901
Defence
1921 disestablishments in Australia
1901 establishments in Australia